Aeromicrobium camelliae is a Gram-positive, aerobic and  non-spore-forming bacterium from the genus Aeromicrobium which has been isolated from Pu'er tea in Yunnan in China.

References 

Propionibacteriales
Bacteria described in 2015